The Romanian transitional alphabet, also known as the civil alphabet, was a series of alphabets containing a mix of Cyrillic and Latin characters used for the Romanian language in the 19th century. It replaced the Romanian Cyrillic alphabet and was in turn replaced by the Romanian Latin alphabet.

The transition process began in 1828 thanks to the grammars of Ion Heliade Rădulescu, although the Romanian Orthodox Church continued to use the Romanian Cyrillic for religious purposes until 1881, after the declaration of independence of Romania. The  decided to replace the Cyrillic alphabet in that year under secular pressure.

The Romanian transitional alphabet began to gain more popularity after 1840, when Latin letters were first introduced between Cyrillic ones and then replacing some of the Cyrillic letters with Latin letters so that the readers of Romanian from Moldavia, Transylvania and Wallachia could become accustomed to them. The final turning point was completed under French influence, which arose due to the Wallachian and Moldavian revolutions of 1848 and the Crimean War which ended with the Treaty of Paris of 1856.

The complete replacement of the Cyrillic alphabet by the Latin alphabet in the United Principalities of Moldavia and Wallachia was formalized in 1862 by Prince Alexandru Ioan Cuza. The Romanian transitional alphabet became one of the symbols of Romanian unity and the national-bourgeois revolution, a direct consequence of the Revolutions of 1848 that also affected Wallachia and Moldavia.

See also
 Romanian Cyrillic alphabet
 Romanian alphabet
 Re-latinization of Romanian
 Old Church Slavonic in Romania

References

History of the Romanian language
Romanization
Cyrillic alphabets
Latin alphabets
Writing systems introduced in the 1820s
1820s establishments in Romania